K. David Harrison (born 1966) is a Canadian and American linguist, anthropologist, author, filmmaker, and activist for the documentation and preservation of endangered languages.

Biography
Harrison received his PhD from Yale University as a student of Stephen R. Anderson. He has done documentary field work on endangered languages in Siberia and Mongolia including Tuvan, Tsengel Tuvan, Tofa, Chulym, Monchak, and in India on Munda, and also in Paraguay, Chile, Papua New Guinea, India, Micronesia, Vietnam, and Vanuatu. He specializes in phonology, morphology, and in the study of language endangerment, extinction and revitalization, digital lexicography, and environmental linguistics.

Harrison is Vice-Provost for Academic Affairs and Dean of Student Experience at VinUniversity. He has been a Professor of Linguistics and Cognitive Science at Swarthmore College, an Explorer at the National Geographic Society and a fellow of The Explorers Club. He serves as an Honorary Research Associate at the Center for Economic Botany of New York Botanical Garden. His early career research focused on the Turkic languages of central Siberia and western Mongolia. In 2006, Harrison created the first online "Talking Dictionary" a platform that has since expanded to cover 140+ indigenous languages. In 2007–2013, he co-directed the Enduring Voices Project at the National Geographic Society. In 2007, Harrison created the concept of "Language Hotspots", and published the first language hotspots list and map in National Geographic Magazine, a collaboration with linguist Gregory Anderson of the Living Tongues Institute for Endangered Languages. His book When Languages Die: The Extinction of the World's Languages and the Erosion of Human Knowledge (Oxford Univ. Press, 2007) has been translated into Arabic and Spanish. His book The Last Speakers: The Quest to Save the World's Most Endangered Languages (National Geographic, 2010) has been translated into Japanese.

He co-starred in Ironbound Films' Emmy-nominated 2008 documentary film The Linguists. He served as director of research for the non-profit Living Tongues Institute for Endangered Languages, and has served on the boards of 7,000 Languages, The National Museum of Language, and BeeLine Reader Inc. He is a Member of the Daylight Academy (Switzerland).

He has received numerous research grants from the National Science Foundation, Volkswagen Stiftung, The Explorers Club, The Discovery Channel, National Geographic Society, Smithsonian Center for Folklife and Cultural Heritage, and Velux Stiftung, including projects on the documentation of endangered languages, cultural anthropology, ethnobotany, and daylight studies. Harrison's research is in digital lexicography (creating Talking Dictionaries), and Environmental Linguistics in locations such as Vanuatu, Fiji, Vietnam, and Siberia.

Awards and honors
 National Merit Scholar
 Explorers Club National Fellow (2015)
 National Geographic Fellow and Explorer
 Named to the Explorers Club EC 50: Fifty People Changing the World (2021)

References

As editor
Davis, Wade and K. David Harrison (2008) Book of Peoples of the World: A Guide to Cultures, National Geographic, (2nd edition).

External links

Environmental Linguistics 
Page for Swarthmore College Linguistics
VinUniversity
National Geographic Society Enduring Voices Project
The Economist "Seven Questions for K. David Harrison"
BBC News "The Tragedy of Dying Languages"
Selected publications available online

Linguists from the United States
American anthropologists
Linguists from Canada
Living people
People from Ponoka, Alberta
Swarthmore College faculty
Jagiellonian University alumni
Yale University alumni
American University alumni
1966 births
American Turkologists
American University School of International Service alumni
Gay men